Retrievability is a term associated with the ease with which information can be found or retrieved using an information system, specifically a search engine or information retrieval system.

A document (or information object) has high retrievability if there are many queries which retrieve the document via the search engine, and the document is ranked sufficiently high that a user would encounter the document. Conversely, if there are few queries that retrieve the document, or when the document is retrieved the documents are not high enough in the ranked list, then the document has low retrievability.

Retrievability can be considered as one aspect of findability.

Applications of retrievability include detecting search engine bias, measuring algorithmic bias, evaluating the influence of search technology, tuning information retrieval systems and evaluating the quality of documents in a collection.

See also
 Information retrieval
 Knowledge mining
 Search engine optimization
 Findability

References

Web design
Knowledge representation
Information science